A Josephson diode is an electronic device that superconducts electrical current in one direction and is resistive in the other direction. The device is a Josephson junction exhibiting a superconducting diode effect (SDE). It is an example of a quantum material Josephson junction (QMJJ), where the weak link in the junction is a quantum material.

Josephson diodes can be subdivided into two categories, those requiring an external (magnetic) field and those not requiring an external magnetic field; the so-called “field-free” Josephson diodes. In 2021, the field-free Josephson diode was realized.

History 

The Josephson diode is named after British physicist Brian David Josephson, who predicted the Josephson effect; and the resistive diode, since it has a similar function. In 2007 a "Josephson diode" was proposed with a design that was similar to conventional p-n junctions in semiconductor, but utilizing hole and electron doped superconductors. This is different from the "Josephson fluxonic diode" that was introduced before the 2000s. It is also different from how the term is currently used, where a Josephson diode is a Josephson junction exhibiting a superconducting diode effect.

In 2020, a superconducting diode effect was shown in an artificial [Nb/V/Ta]n superlattice.  A field-free superconducting diode effect was realized in 2021, in a van der Waals heterostructure of NbSe2/Nb3Br8/NbSe2 - a Josephson diode.  This heterostructure is a quantum material Josephson junction, where the weak link (Nb3Br8) is a quantum material, that is predicted to be an obstructed atomic insulator / Mott insulator.

The conductor used in the 2020 demonstration was non-centrosymmetric which breaks spatial symmetry, meaning it distinguishes between electrons with positive and negative momentum. In addition, the 2021 system also broke temporal symmetry – allowing spin-up electrons with positive momentum to behave differently from spin-down electrons with negative momentum.

Superconducting diode effect 

The superconducting diode effect is an example of nonreciprocal superconductivity, where a material is superconducting in one direction and resistive in the other. This leads to half-wave rectification when a square wave AC-current is applied. In 2020, this effect was demonstrated in an artificial [Nb/V/Ta]n superlattice. The phenomenon in the Josephson diode is believed to originate from asymmetric Josephson tunneling.

Theories 
Currently, the precise mechanism behind the Josephson diode effect is not fully understood. However, some theories have emerged that are now under theoretical investigation. There are two types of Josephson diodes, relating to which symmetries are being broken. The inversion breaking Josephson diode and the inversion breaking plus time-reversal breaking Josephson diode. The minimal symmetry breaking requirement for forming the Josephson diode is inversion symmetry breaking. The symmetry breaking is required to obtain nonreciprocal transport. Another proposed mechanism for short Josephson junctions, originates from finite momentum Cooper pairs. It may also be possible that the superconducting diode effect in the JD originates from self-field effects, but this still has to be rigorously studied.

References 

Diodes
Josephson effect